Berbeo is a town and municipality in the Lengupá Province, part of the Colombian department of Boyacá. Berbeo borders San Eduardo in the east, Zetaquirá and Miraflores in the west, Zetaquirá in the north and Miraflores and Páez in the south.

Etymology 
The municipality was formerly called San Fernando de Aguablanca and Legupá, and since 1913 bears the name Berbeo, after Juan Francisco Berbeo.

History 
The area of Berbeo before the Spanish conquest was inhabited by the indigenous Muisca. In Berbeo petroglyphs have been discovered. Modern Berbeo was founded on April 23, 1743, by Jesuits.

Economy 
Main activity of Berbeo is agriculture, with coffee and chonto tomatoes as major products.

Gallery

References 

Municipalities of Boyacá Department
Populated places established in 1743
1743 establishments in the Spanish Empire
Muisca Confederation